Here and Now is an album by American jazz pianist Hampton Hawes recorded in 1965 and released on the Contemporary label.

Reception
The Allmusic review by Scott Yanow called the album "interesting but not essential" and stated "In general, the treatments are somewhat straight-ahead ("The Girl from Ipanema" is taken as swing rather than bossa nova), and Hawes' solos transform some of the tunes a bit".

Track listing
 "Fly Me to the Moon" (Bart Howard) - 6:59
 "What Kind of Fool Am I?" (Leslie Bricusse, Anthony Newley) - 4:42
 "The Girl from Ipanema" (Antônio Carlos Jobim, Vinicius de Moraes, Norman Gimbel) - 4:06
 "Rhonda" (Hampton Hawes) - 3:37
 "Dear Heart" (Henry Mancini, Ray Evans, Jay Livingston) - 5:27
 "People" (Jule Styne, Bob Merrill) - 5:05 		
 "Chim Chim Cher-ee" (Richard M. Sherman, Robert B. Sherman) - 4:27
 "Days of Wine and Roses" (Henry Mancini, Johnny Mercer) - 4:43

Personnel
Hampton Hawes - piano
Chuck Israels - bass
Donald Bailey - drums

References

Contemporary Records albums
Hampton Hawes albums
1965 albums